People associated with Redding, Connecticut, listed in the area they are best known:

Actors, musicians and entertainers

 Paul Avgerinos (born 1957), musician and electronic music composer
 Leonard Bernstein (1918–1990), composer and conductor, lived on Fox Run Road in the 1950s
 Michael Ian Black (born 1971), actor, comedian and author
 Ritchie Blackmore (born 1945), musician, former resident
 John Byrum (born 1947), motion picture director, screenwriter, and producer, long-time resident of West Redding
 Diana Canova (born 1953), actress; spouse of Grammy Award-winning producer Elliott Scheiner
 Rachel Crothers (1979–1958), playwright and director
 Hume Cronyn (1911–2003), Academy Award-nominated actor, lived with his wife, Jessica Tandy, on Stepney Road in the 1940s and 1950s
 Morton DaCosta (1914–1989), director and producer of films and Broadway shows
 Daryl Hall (born 1946), musician with Hall & Oates, lived on Topstone Road
 Jascha Heifetz (1901–1987), violinist, lived on Sanfordtown Road in the 1940s
 Matt Hoverman (born 1968), actor, playwright
 Charles Ives (1874–1954), musician, composer
 Igor Kipnis (1930–2002), musician who died at his home in town
 John Kirkpatrick (born 1947), musician, professor and writer
 Hope Lange (1933–2003), Emmy Award-winning, Oscar-nominated actress
 Jack Lawrence (1912–2009), composer inducted into the Songwriters Hall of Fame in 1975
 Barry Levinson (born 1942), Academy Award-winning film director
 Enoch Light (1905–1978), composer, musician, music label executive and sound technician
 Meat Loaf (1947–2022), rock singer, Joel Barlow High School softball coach during the 1990s
 Lori March Scourby (1923–2013), once known as the "first lady of daytime television" for her roles in soap operas
 Carmen Mathews (1911–1995), actress, environment and philanthropist; created New Pond Farm preserve and camp for disadvantaged children
 Fred Newman (born 1952), actor, voice actor, composer, and sound effects artist, current resident
 Colleen Zenk Pinter (born 1953), actress; spouse of Mark Pinter
 Mark Pinter (born 1950), actor; spouse of Colleen Zenk Pinter
 Derek Piotr (born 1991), composer and vocalist
 Andy Powell (born 1950), guitarist and only constant member of British progressive rock group Wishbone Ash, has lived in Redding since 1991
 Elliot Scheiner (born 1947), engineer and five-time Grammy Award-winning producer; spouse of actress Diana Canova
 Karen Kopins Shaw (born 1961), actress in films; winner of Miss Connecticut pageant in 1977
 Jessica Tandy (1909–1994), Academy Award-winning actress, lived with her husband, Hume Cronyn (1911–2003), on Stepney Road in the 1940s and 1950s
 Russ Titelman (born 1944), Grammy-winning record producer, lived in town in the 1980s
 Mary Travers (1936–2009), of the Peter, Paul and Mary group
 Guinevere Van Seenus (born 1977), model, photographer and jewelry designer
 Marcy Walker (born 1961), actress, lived in West Redding during the mid-1990s
 Maura West (born 1972), daytime Emmy Award-winning actress on As the World Turns
 Frank Whaley (born 1963), actor, director, and screenwriter who had roles in multiple films by Oliver Stone

Authors and other writers 

 Joel Barlow (1754–1812), poet and diplomat, born in Redding
 Julian Barry (born 1930), Oscar nominee for Lenny, resident since 2001
 Ann Beattie (born 1947), author of eight novels and short stories in The New Yorker and other publications
 Marcia Brown (1918–2015), children's book author and illustrator
 Stuart Chase (1988–1985), author credited with coining the slogan "A New Deal" for Franklin D. Roosevelt, lived in Redding from the 1930s until his death in 1985
 Les Daniels (1943–2011), author and noted historian on comic books
 Howard Fast (1914–2003), author, lived on Cross Highway in the 1980s
 Robert Fitzgerald (1910–1985), translator, poet, mentor of Flannery O'Connor, lived on Seventy Acre Road
 William Honan (1930–2014), Pulitzer Prize-nominated author
 Eliot Janeway (1913–1993), author and economist; spouse of Elizabeth Janeway and father of Michael Janeway
 Elizabeth Janeway (1913–2005), novelist, spouse of Eliot Janeway and father of Michael Janeway
 Michael Janeway (1940–2014), author and editor of The Boston Globe; son of Eliot and Elizabeth Janeway
 Holly Keller (born 1942), children's author and illustrator, lived in West Redding in the 1970s, 1980s, and 1990s
 Phyllis Krasilovsky (1926–2014), authored 20 books for children between 1950 and 1997
 Joseph Wood Krutch (1893–1970), author and naturalist, lived on Limekiln Road in the 1940s
 Flannery O'Connor (1925–1964), novelist, wrote Wise Blood while a boarder at the home of Robert Fitzgerald and family on Seventy Acre Road (from 1949 to 1951)
 Albert Bigelow Paine (1861–1937), writer, lived on Diamond Hill
 Jane and Michael Stern (both born 1946), of West Redding, write the "Roadfood" column for Gourmet magazine; authors of Roadfood and other books
 Ruth Stout (1884–1980), writer about organic gardening
 Anne Parrish Titzell (1888–1957), children's book author, lived on Peaceable Street
 Ada Josephine Todd (1858–1904), author and educator
 Alvin Toffler (1928–2016), author of Future Shock, lived on Mountain Road
 Aaron Louis Treadwell Ph.D. (1866–1947), college professor; author of The Cytogeny of Podarke obscura and other scientific books
 Tasha Tudor (1915–2008), children's author and artist, lived on Tudor Road
 Mark Twain (born Samuel Clemens) (1835–1910), lived in mansion dubbed "Stormfield" built on land located on present-day Mark Twain Lane from 1908 to 1910

Artists, art experts and critics, cartoonists 

 Dan Beard (1850–1941), illustrator and one of the founders of the Boy Scouts of America; lived on Great Pasture
 Rebecca Couch (1788–1863), painter
 Katherine Sophie Dreier (1877–1952), late artist and patron of the arts who helped found the Museum of Modern Art, lived on Marchant Road in 1912
 Hal Foster (1892–1982), Prince Valiant cartoonist
 Gill Fox (1915–2004), two-time Pulitzer Prize-nominated cartoonist
 Anna Hyatt Huntington (1876–1973), artist; with husband Archer Huntington, gave land to create Collis P. Huntington State Park
 Robert Natkin (1930–2010), abstract expressionist
 Edward Steichen (1879–1973), artist and photographer, lived on Topstone (Topstone Park was his property)

People in government and politics

 Stephen Barlow (1779–1845), member of the U.S. House of Representatives from Pennsylvania 1827-29, born in Redding
 Dudley S. Gregory (1800–1874), member of the U.S. House of Representatives from New Jersey 1847-49, born in Redding
 Ebenezer J. Hill (1845–1917), Connecticut member of the United States House of Representatives from 1895 to 1913
 David Lilienthal (1899–1981), scientist and director of the U.S. Atomic Energy Commission and the Tennessee Valley Authority, lived on Stepney Road
 Dick Morris (born 1946), political consultant and author
 Walter White (1893–1955), former head (executive secretary) of NAACP, lived on Seventy Acres Road

Other

 Wendell Garner (1921–2008), Yale University researcher who made significant contributions to the cognitive revolution, retired to Meadow Ridge
 Frank M. Hawks (1897–1938), aviator who made the fourth-ever nonstop coast-to-coast flight in the United States in 1929, lived in town
 Alfred Winslow Jones (1900–1989), hedge fund manager, lived on Poverty Hollow Road
 Alex Kroll, inductee of the College Football Hall of Fame and Advertising Hall of Fame, lived in town
 Lawrence Kudlow (born 1947), host of Kudlow and Company television program, current resident
 Gerald M. Loeb (1899–1974), author and founding partner of brokerage E.F. Hutton
 Lee MacPhail (1917–2012), former Major League Baseball commissioner and inductee to the National Baseball Hall of Fame
 Christopher McCormick, CEO of L.L. Bean
 Lauren S. McCready (1915–2007), a founder of the U.S. Merchant Marine Academy
 Charlie Morton (born 1983), Major League Baseball pitcher; raised in Redding, attended Joel Barlow High School
 Arthur D. Nicholson, United States Army officer shot and killed by a Soviet sentry in 1985, while conducting intelligence activities in East Germany
 Clementine Paddleford (1898–1967), author and food critic who coined the term "hero" for the submarine sandwich
 Major General Samuel Holden Parsons (1737–1789), commander in the Continental Army under Gen. Israel Putnam, later chief judge of the Northwest Territory, lived on Black Rock Turnpike
 Lucien M. Underwood (1853–1907), founding member of the New York Botanical Society
 Chickens Warrups, established a Native American village on land that eventually became part of Redding

See also

 List of people from Connecticut
 List of people from Bridgeport, Connecticut
 List of people from Brookfield, Connecticut
 List of people from Darien, Connecticut
 List of people from Greenwich, Connecticut
 List of people from Hartford, Connecticut
 List of people from New Canaan, Connecticut
 List of people from New Haven, Connecticut
 List of people from Norwalk, Connecticut
 List of people from Ridgefield, Connecticut
 List of people from Stamford, Connecticut
 List of people from Westport, Connecticut

References 

People from Fairfield County, Connecticut
Redding Connecticut